San Mateo Peak is the unofficially named  peak, at the western end of the ridge running west then northwest from Elsinore Peak to Morrell Canyon, south and west of the Morrell Potrero in the Elsinore Mountains of the Santa Ana Mountain Range.  The peak name was given by Sierra Club Lower Peaks Committee Guide, originally named by Ken Croker who for 20 years maintained trails in the Santa Ana Mountains with volunteers from the Sierra Club.  It remains officially nameless despite being the highest summit in the Elsinore Mountains, higher than Elsinore Peak, at 3536 ft., the highest named peak in those mountains.

San Mateo Creek has its source at an elevation of 2800 feet, in the canyon on the western face of this peak.  A fork of Morrell Canyon Creek, a tributary of San Juan Creek, has its source on the northeast face of this peak as do several arroyos descending to the west from the peak into that same creek.  An unnamed arroyo, also tributary to San Mateo Creek has its source on the southwest face of ridge descending to the south from this peak.

References

External links 
 
 

Mountains of Riverside County, California
Santa Ana Mountains
Cleveland National Forest
Mountains of Southern California